George Evelyn (18 June 1617 – 4 October 1699) was an English politician who sat in the House of Commons  at various times between 1640 and 1689.

Evelyn was the son of Richard Evelyn of Wotton, Surrey. He matriculated at Trinity College, Oxford on 24 October 1634, aged 18. He was a student of Middle Temple in 1636.

In November 1640, Evelyn was elected Member of Parliament for Reigate in the Long Parliament. He sat until 1648 when he was excluded under Pride's Purge.
  
In 1661, Evelyn was elected MP for Haslemere in the Cavalier Parliament.  In 1678 he was elected MP for Surrey and sat until 1681. He was elected MP for Surrey again in 1689 and sat until 1690. 

Evelyn died at the age of 82.

References

1617 births
1699 deaths
Alumni of Trinity College, Oxford
Members of the Middle Temple
People from Surrey (before 1889)
English MPs 1640–1648
English MPs 1661–1679
English MPs 1679
English MPs 1680–1681
English MPs 1681
English MPs 1689–1690